Zeki Akar (born April 1, 1944 in Niksar), is a Turkish judge and served as the first president of the Court of Cassation.

External links
  Zeki Akar at the official High Court of Appeals site

1944 births
Living people
People from Niksar
Court of Cassation (Turkey) justices
Turkish civil servants